Vriesea barbosae is a plant species in the genus Vriesea. This species is endemic to Brazil.

References

barbosae
Flora of Brazil